Seam allowance (sometimes called inlays) is the area between the fabric edge and the stitching line on two (or more) pieces of material being sewn together.

A 5/8″(1.5cm) seam allowance provides enough extra between the seam line and the cut edge of the fabric to make sure that the fabric will be safely caught as they are being joining together. This is particularly important when working with fabrics that ravel easily.

Curved seams generally have a smaller seam allowance than straight seams; bulky seams with a large amount of seam allowance are more difficult to press into or conform to a curved shape.

References

Seams